HNK Sloga Uskoplje (full name: Hrvatski nogometni klub Sloga Uskoplje) is a football club from Gornji Vakuf-Uskoplje, Bosnia and Herzegovina.

The club was formed in 1946 and its main colour is red.

Achievements 
Herzeg-Bosnia Cup: Runners-up (1)
 1996
Bosnia and Herzegovina Football Cup: Second round (2)
 2009/2010, 2010/2011
Second league – South: Runners-up (1)
 2011

External links 

 HNK Sloga Uskoplje official site 

Sloga Uskoplje
Sloga Uskoplje
Sport in the Federation of Bosnia and Herzegovina
Association football clubs established in 1946
Gornji Vakuf-Uskoplje
1946 establishments in Bosnia and Herzegovina